Zhou Dan (born January 1974) is a lawyer, scholar and activist in China. He lives in Shanghai, China. Zhou is a leading voice for rights of gay and lesbian people in mainland China. Writing with his real name about being gay on Chinese websites for years, he came out to a local newspaper about his gay identity in November 2003. Since then, his name has been from time to time mentioned in Chinese newspapers, magazines and television programs.

Zhou also fights for rights of people living with or affected by HIV/AIDS in China, by advocating a human-rights-based approach to the epidemic. In April 2003 he founded the Shanghai Hotline For Sexual Minorities.

From January to May 2004, Zhou was a visiting scholar at the Yale Law School China Law Center with research emphasis on equality and anti-discrimination related to sexuality and HIV/AIDS. He once gave several lectures on a graduate class in homosexuality health and an undergraduate class in homosexuality at Fudan University in Shanghai.

Zhou was profiled in the May 2005 issue of Têtu, a French gay and lesbian magazine, and in the June 27, 2005 issue of TIME Magazine.

References

External links

1974 births
HIV/AIDS activists
Educators from Shanghai
20th-century Chinese lawyers
21st-century Chinese lawyers
Gay men
Living people
Chinese LGBT rights activists
LGBT lawyers
People's Republic of China LGBT people